Tidjikja is a department of Tagant Region in Mauritania.

References 

Departments of Mauritania